BrooWaha was an online citizen newspaper with a focus on local news. The articles published on the website are written exclusively by its users.

Several local editions of BrooWaha were launched for a number of major U.S. cities. The content of all these editions was aggregated in the main BrooWaha website. By 2013, all local editions were defunct and redirected to the main site.

The website was featured in the Los Angeles Times in December 2006.

Notes

Further reading

External links 
 

Citizen journalism
American news websites
Social bookmarking
Citizen journalism websites